Robert Timothy Robinson (born 21 November 1958) is a former English cricketer, and current cricket umpire who played in 29 Test matches and 26 One Day Internationals for England from 1984 to 1989.

Born in Sutton-in-Ashfield, Nottinghamshire, Robinson played for Nottinghamshire from 1978 to 1999, receiving his first team cap in 1983. Robinson was club captain between 1988 and 1995, and was made one of the Wisden Cricketers of the Year in 1986. Robinson was educated at High Pavement Grammar School in Nottingham.

International career
Robinson was an opener who modelled his batting style upon Geoff Boycott's. He made a promising start to his England career, with 160 in the second Test in 1984–85 against India in Delhi, and two big centuries against Australia in the 1985 Ashes series. However, he was found out, as were many other England batsmen, by the West Indies pace attack in the 1985–86 series, when he managed just 72 runs in eight innings. Robinson returned to form with 166 against Pakistan the following year.

He toured with England in 1987–88 playing in the 1987 Cricket World Cup and tours of Pakistan, Australia and New Zealand. It was a disappointing season for Robinson, whose World Cup is probably most memorable for being out lbw first ball to Craig McDermott in the final. In Australia for the Bicentennial Test at Sydney, Robinson was again found out for his inability to handle short balls that he could not hook, when Tony Dodemaide dismissed him.

He played one undistinguished Test match against Sri Lanka at the end of the 1988 English summer, where his inability against pace bowling was evident, as he was bounced out by Sri Lanka's medium pace attack. By now, it was apparent that his temperament for facing short pitched fast bowling had waned. England did not tour in 1988–89, due to a row between the Indian and English cricket boards over Graham Gooch's South African connections.

Robinson played in his final Test match against Australia at Old Trafford in 1989. Before the game had concluded, it was announced that Robinson was in a proposed party of sixteen players to join that coming winter's rebel tour to South Africa.

Domestic career
Robinson continued to play county cricket until 1999. He played a total of 425 first-class matches, scoring 27,571 runs at an average of 42.15, and amassing 63 centuries. He also bowled a maiden over in a Test match (his only outing at that level with ball in hand). He was Nottinghamshire's captain when they won the Benson and Hedges Cup in 1989, making his team's top score in the final.

Umpiring career
Robinson was appointed to the ECB First-Class Umpires List in 2007. His first international match was England vs New Zealand in 2013.

In January 2018, he was named as one of the seventeen on-field umpires for the 2018 Under-19 Cricket World Cup.

See also
 List of One Day International cricket umpires
 List of Twenty20 International cricket umpires

References

External links

1958 births
Living people
Cricketers at the 1987 Cricket World Cup
English cricket umpires
English One Day International cricket umpires
English Twenty20 International cricket umpires
England Test cricketers
England One Day International cricketers
English cricketers
Marylebone Cricket Club cricketers
Nottinghamshire cricketers
Nottinghamshire cricket captains
People educated at Nottingham High Pavement Grammar School
Cricketers from Sutton-in-Ashfield
Wisden Cricketers of the Year
Young England cricketers